Chase Lucas (born March 4, 1997) is an American football cornerback for the Detroit Lions of the National Football League (NFL). He played college football at Arizona State.

Early career
Lucas played at Chandler High School in Chandler, Arizona. He started at running back as a sophomore. As a junior, Lucas helped Chandler win its first state championship since 1949. The team featured future NFL players N'Keal Harry and Bryce Perkins. Lucas contributed 113 rushing yards and 37 receiving yards in the 28-7 win over Chandler Hamilton. He was selected to play in the U.S. Army All American Bowl.

College career
During Lucas' first year as a true freshman, ASU coach Todd Graham considered playing Lucas for his talent, but choose not to so that Lucas could learn.  After taking a redshirt year, Lucas was able to play as a redshirt freshman and was named to the USA Today All-Freshman team and the All-Pac-12 Second Team.  He was the only freshman to earn all-conference honors in Pac-12.  During spring training before his sophomore year, Lucas was slated to be the number 1 corner for Arizona state. His final season, Lucas was captain of the Sun Devils and was an honorable mention all-conference selection.

Professional career

Lucas was selected by the Detroit Lions in the seventh round, 237th overall, of the 2022 NFL Draft. He was placed on injured reserve on December 10, 2022.

References

External links
 Detroit Lions bio
 Arizona State Sun Devils Bio
 
 

1997 births
Living people
Sportspeople from Chandler, Arizona
Players of American football from Arizona
American football cornerbacks
Arizona State Sun Devils football players
Detroit Lions players